Allium chamaemoly, called dwarf garlic, is a species of garlic native to the Mediterranean region and cultivated elsewhere for its pretty flowers and potently aromatic bulbs. It is found in the wild in Spain (incl Balearic Is), France (incl Corsica), Malta, Italy (inc Sardinia + Sicily), Greece, the Balkans,  Algeria, and Morocco.

Allium chamaemoly is a small plant growing from an underground bulb. Scape is very short or completely absent, so that the umbel forms at ground level. Tepals are white, usually with a purple midvein. Leaves are flat and grass-like, often with long white hairs.

Two formal botanical varieties are recognized:
 Allium chamaemoly subsp. chamaemoly - most of European species range but not North Africa
 Allium chamaemoly subsp. longicaulis Pastor & Valdés - Spain (incl Balearic Is), Algeria, Morocco

References

chamaemoly
Garlic
Plants described in 1753
Taxa named by Carl Linnaeus
Flora of Malta